Indian spices include a variety of spices grown across the Indian subcontinent (a sub-region of South Asia). With different climates in different parts of the country, India produces a variety of spices, many of which are native to the subcontinent. Others were imported from similar climates and have since been cultivated locally for centuries. Pepper, turmeric, cardamom, and cumin are some examples of Indian spices. 

Spices are used in different forms: whole, chopped, ground, roasted, sautéed, fried, and as a topping. They blend food to extract the nutrients and bind them in a palatable form. Some spices are added at the end as a flavouring — those are typically heated in a pan with ghee (Indian clarified butter) or cooking oil before being added to a dish. Lighter spices are added last, and spices with strong flavour should be added first. "Curry" refers to any dish in Indian cuisine that contains several spices blended together, whether dry or with a gravy base. However, it also refers to curry leaves, commonly used in South India.

Below is a list of spices and other flavouring substances commonly used in India.

See also
Spice trade
Masala dabba, traditional spice box
Spice Mixes

References

External links

  

 
 

Indian spices
Spices
Desi culture